Green Lantern is a 2011 American superhero film based on the DC Comics character of the same name. The film stars Ryan Reynolds, Blake Lively, Peter Sarsgaard, Mark Strong, Angela Bassett, and Tim Robbins, with Martin Campbell directing a script by Greg Berlanti and comic book writers Michael Green and Marc Guggenheim, which was subsequently rewritten by Michael Goldenberg. This was the first DC film since Catwoman (2003) not to be involved with Legendary Pictures. The film tells the story of Hal Jordan, a test pilot who is selected to become the first human member of an intergalactic police force called the Green Lantern Corps; he is given a ring that grants him superpowers, and must confront Parallax, a being who threatens to upset the balance of power in the universe, while a new threat rises back on Earth.

The film first entered development in 1997; progress remained stalled until Berlanti was hired to write and direct in October 2007. Martin Campbell was brought on board in February 2009 after Berlanti was forced to vacate the director's position. Most of the live-action actors were cast between July 2009 and February 2010, and filming took place from March to August 2010 in Louisiana. The film was converted to 3D during its post-production stage.

Green Lantern was released by Warner Bros. Pictures on June 17, 2011 to negative reviews, with criticism aimed at its script, tone, visual effects, and unfaithfulness to the source material. The film was one of the biggest box-office bombs in history, grossing $220 million against a production budget of $200 million. It was also originally intended to start a film franchise based on DC characters. However, due to the film's negative reception and disappointing box office performance, Warner Bros. scrapped plans for a sequel, opting instead to use Man of Steel (2013) as the official start of the DC Extended Universe, two years after Green Lanterns release.

Plot 

Billions of years ago, the Guardians of the Universe use the green essence of willpower to create an intergalactic police force called the Green Lantern Corps. They divide the universe into 3,600 sectors, with one Green Lantern per sector. One such Green Lantern, Abin Sur of Sector 2814, defeats the malevolent being Parallax and imprisons him in the Lost Sector on the desolate planet Ryut. In the present day, Parallax escapes from his prison after becoming strengthened by an encounter with crash survivors who had accidentally fallen into the dugout where Parallax was imprisoned on the abandoned planet. Parallax feeds on their fear to gain strength before pursuing and mortally wounding Abin Sur, who escapes and crash-lands on Earth where he commands his power ring to find a worthy successor.

Hal Jordan, a cocky test pilot working at Ferris Aircraft, is chosen by the ring and transported to the crash site, where the dying Abin Sur appoints him a Green Lantern, telling him to take the lantern and speak the oath. Hal says the oath and is whisked away to the Green Lantern Corps home planet of Oa, where he meets and trains with veteran Corps members Tomar-Re, Kilowog, and Corps leader Sinestro, who believes he is unfit and fearful. Hal, disheartened by his extreme training sessions and Sinestro's doubts, quits and returns to Earth, keeping the power ring and lantern.

Scientist Hector Hammond is summoned by his father, Senator Robert Hammond, to a secret government facility to perform an autopsy on Abin Sur's body under the watchful eye of Amanda Waller. A piece of Parallax inside the corpse enters Hammond, giving him psychic powers at the cost of his health and sanity. After discovering that he was chosen for the secret work only due to his father's influence and not for his own abilities, Hammond attempts to kill his father by telekinetically sabotaging his helicopter at a massive party with the use of Parallax's power. Hal saves the senator and the party guests, including his childhood sweetheart Carol Ferris. 

The following night, Hal visits Carol Ferris's home in costume, but she immediately recognizes him after getting a closer look. Then they spend a peaceful time together. However, Carol becomes saddened after learning that Hal quit the Corps. Later, at the government facility, Hammond uses his telekinesis to successfully kill his father by burning him alive. Hammond also elevates Waller high above the floor. As she's falling, Hal arrives and saves the injured Waller by creating a pool of water which whisks her away out of further danger. During the encounter, Hal telepathically connects with Hammond and learns of Parallax coming to Earth, before Hammond escapes.

On Oa, the Guardians tell Sinestro that Parallax was one of their fellow guardians who attempted to control the yellow essence of fear, only to become corrupted himself. Arguing that the way to fight fear is with fear itself, Sinestro requests that the Guardians forge a ring of the same yellow power, preparing to concede Earth's destruction to Parallax in order to protect Oa. Hal appears and tries to convince the Guardians that fear will turn the users evil if its power is used, but they reject his pleas, and he returns to Earth to try to defeat Parallax on his own.

Hal saves Carol from Hammond after a brief showdown. Parallax arrives, consumes Hammond's entire life force, and then wreaks havoc on Coast City. After a fierce battle, Hal lures Parallax away from Earth to chase him across the Solar System. Parallax is caught in the sun's gravitational pull and is destroyed. Hal loses consciousness after the battle and falls toward the star, but is saved by Sinestro, Kilowog, and Tomar-Re.
 
The entire Green Lantern Corps congratulates Hal for his bravery. Sinestro tells Hal he now bears the responsibility of protecting his sector as a Green Lantern. Hal and Carol spend one last time together, and he tells her that he'll be away for a while. The two share a kiss and Hal flies away.
 
In a mid-credits scene, Sinestro takes the yellow ring and places it on his finger, causing his green suit and eyes to turn yellow.

Cast 

 Ryan Reynolds as  Hal Jordan / Green Lantern:  A test pilot for the Ferris Aircraft Company whose will to act qualifies him to become the first earthman ever inducted into an intergalactic peacekeeping force fueled by green energy of will. Reynolds said, "I've known about 'Green Lantern' my whole life, but I've never really followed it before. I fell in love with the character when I met with Martin Campbell". Reynolds called the film "an origin story to a certain degree, but it's not a labored origin story, where the movie begins in the third act. The movie starts when it starts. We find out Hal is the guy fairly early on, and the adventure begins". Alternatively Chris Pine, Sam Worthington, Jon Hamm, Nathan Fillion (who voiced the character in animated DC Comics projects), Bradley Cooper, Justin Timberlake and Jared Leto were considered for the role, while Brian Austin Green, a Green Lantern fan, campaigned for the part, but ultimately did not audition. 
 Gattlin Griffith portrays a young Jordan.
 Blake Lively as Carol Ferris:  The vice president of Ferris Aircraft and a long-time love interest of Hal Jordan. One pseudonymous writer citing unnamed sources said Lively was among five leading contenders that included Eva Green, Keri Russell, Diane Kruger, and Jennifer Garner. About her stunt work in which she rehearsed with stunt coordinator Gary Powell (Casino Royale, The Bourne Ultimatum, Quantum of Solace), gymnastic acrobats from Cirque du Soleil and used aerial stunt rigs created for The Matrix, Lively explained, "Our director likes it real—the fights close and dirty... I'm 40 feet in the air, spiraling around. That's the best workout you can ever do because it's all core... You do that for ten minutes and you should see your body the next day! It's so exhilarating, so thrilling—and nauseating".
Jenna Craig portrays a young Ferris.
 Peter Sarsgaard as Hector Hammond:  A scientist who is exposed to the yellow energy of fear from Parallax, which causes his brain to grow to an enormous size and grants him psionic powers. Regarding his preparation for the role, Sarsgaard stated, "I actually did hang with this biologist from Tulane that was I think just the most eccentric guy they could find. He was entertaining, and he and I actually worked on my lecture that I give in [Green Lantern]." About his character Sarsgaard remarked, "He's got shades of gray. It's eccentricity on top of eccentricity".
Kennon Kepper portrays a young Hammond.
 Mark Strong as Thaal Sinestro:  A Green Lantern and Hal Jordan's mentor. Strong affirmed that the film will follow the origin story, "the film closely follows the early comics. Sinestro starts out as Hal Jordan's mentor, slightly suspicious and not sure of him because obviously Hal is the first human being who's made into a Green Lantern. He's certainly very strict and unsure of the wisdom of Hal becoming a Green Lantern". Strong said, the character "is a military guy but isn't immediately bad. It's the kind of person that lends himself to becoming bad over the course of the comics being written, but initially he's quite a heroic figure." He also revealed that the outfit and other aspects of the character very closely follow the character's early days, "That widow's peak and thin mustache was for some reason originally based on David Niven... So I would like to do justice to the Sinestro that was conceived for the comic books".
 Angela Bassett as Amanda Waller:  A former congressional aide and government agent. About the differences between the comic book and film character Bassett said, "Well, I'm not 300 pounds," but added that her character does have "that intellectual, that bright, that no-nonsense, that means business [personality]. [She's] getting it done and in the trenches nothing fazes her".
 Tim Robbins as Robert Hammond:  A United States senator and the father of the movie's human villain, Hector Hammond.
 Temuera Morrison as Abin Sur:  A Green Lantern who crash lands on Earth and recruits Hal Jordan as his replacement. Morrison said it took four to five hours to put on the prosthetic makeup for the character. About filming with Ryan Reynolds, Morrison commented, "We did the whole scene together where I give him the ring, our suits are CGI so we had these grey suits with things on them so it was cool and working with Martin Campbell again was great too".
 Geoffrey Rush as Tomar-Re:  A bird-beaked member of the Green Lantern Corps who teaches Hal Jordan how to use his cosmic powers. Rush stated he was not initially familiar with Green Lantern but was drawn to the part after seeing the concept art explaining, "When I got the offer for it I said, 'Haven't they made that film?' They said, 'No, it's a completely computer-generated character.' I saw the artwork and I said, I would love to be that guy. Because I had voiced an owl in Legend of the Guardians: The Owls of Ga'Hoole and I'd voiced a pelican in Finding Nemo and I thought I could really improve on that now by being half-bird, half-fish, part lizard. You don't get to do that in a live-action film." Rush compared the role to previous roles where he played a mentoring figure, "You could say that I've mentored Queen Elizabeth I as [Sir Francis] Walsingham, and [Leon] Trotsky has mentored Frida Kahlo and now Tomar Re is going to mentor Hal Jordan, and I was sort of mentoring King George VI in The King's Speech. But I can't imagine Tomar Re setting up an office on Harley Street in London. They're all very different people to me, but there is a kind of theme I suppose".
 Michael Clarke Duncan as Kilowog:  A drill sergeant trainer of new recruits for the Green Lantern Corps. About the character, Duncan, a fan of the comic book, stated, "He's a real type of tough guy who knows everything, and actually in one of the comic books he and Superman fought to a tie".
 Taika Waititi as Thomas Kalmaku:  An Inuit engineer at Ferris Aircraft. Waititi said he was cast after a Warner Bros. casting agent saw his performance in Boy, which he also wrote and directed. Waititi—who has a Jewish mother and Māori father—says the production "had an opening for a role in the film for someone who wasn't, I don't [know], not white or not black."
 Clancy Brown as Parallax: An entity made up of the yellow energy of fear, Parallax was imprisoned by Abin Sur after breaking into the physical plane by possessing the body of a former Guardian of the Universe.
Additionally, Jon Tenney plays Martin Jordan, Hal Jordan's father; Jay O. Sanders portrays Carl Ferris, an aircraft designer, and father of Carol Ferris; Mike Doyle was cast as Jack Jordan, Hal Jordan's older brother; and Nick Jandl was cast as Jim Jordan, Hal Jordan's younger brother.

Production

Development 
In early 1997, Warner Bros. approached cult filmmaker and comic book writer Kevin Smith, who had then just finished writing Superman Lives, to script a Green Lantern film. Smith turned down the offer, believing there were more suitable candidates to make a Green Lantern film. At one point, Quentin Tarantino was offered the chance to write and direct. Warner also considered the property as an action comedy; by 2004, Robert Smigel had completed a script which was set to star Jack Black in the lead role. However, the studio dropped the comedy idea following poor fan reaction from the Internet. David S. Goyer was offered the chance to write and direct either a Green Lantern or Flash film after Warner Bros. was impressed with his screenplay for Batman Begins, but he opted to direct the latter.

Actor-writer Corey Reynolds, a comic book fan of the John Stewart character, pitched Warner an idea for a trilogy, with him starring as John Stewart and performing screenwriting duties. Reynolds intended to introduce Hal Jordan, the Green Lantern Corps, and Justice League in possible sequels. He finished the script for Green Lantern: Birth of a Hero in June 2007, receiving positive feedback from Warner Bros. with a potential 2010 release date. However, the studio abandoned Reynolds' concept, and in October 2007, Greg Berlanti signed to direct the film and co-write it with comic-book writers Michael Green and Marc Guggenheim. A draft of the trio's 2008 script, leaked on the Internet, revealed a story that included the hero's origin and included the characters Carol Ferris, Kilowog, Sinestro, and Guy Gardner in a cameo appearance, and appeared "to set up Hector Hammond as Hal Jordan's ... first major nemesis...."

Shortly afterward, Guggenheim said that the script would contain characterizations inspired by the Denny O'Neil-Neal Adams run on the comic in the 1970s, and Dave Gibbons' work in the early 1980s. He added that he and his co-writers also looked to the 2000s Geoff Johns stories, saying, "It's been interesting because we finished a draft just before [Johns'] 'Secret Origin' [story arc] started up. "So I've been reading 'Secret Origin' with a real interest in seeing 'OK, how did Geoff solve this problem?' There are certain elements just for anyone trying to retell Hal's origin for a modern day audience has to address and grapple with. For example, why the hell was Abin [Sur] flying in a space ship when he's a Green Lantern? You don't ask that question back in the Silver Age, but when you're writing in the Modern Age, you have to answer these things."

Pre-production 
By December 2008, the writers had written three drafts of the screenplay and Warner was preparing for pre-production. However, by February 2009 Berlanti was no longer attached to the project and Martin Campbell entered negotiations to direct. The release date was set as December 2010, before being moved to June 17, 2011. Speaking about the experience in 2016, Berlanti confirmed that he was fired as both director and writer, stating "I had nothing to do with the finished product".

Bradley Cooper, Ryan Reynolds, Justin Timberlake, and Jared Leto were the producers' top choices for the starring role in July 2009. On July 10, Warner announced that Reynolds had been cast as Hal Jordan/Green Lantern. A website reported on January 7, 2010, that a crew-member had written on her blog that the film was greenlit the day before and that filming would begin in 10 weeks. Also in January, Blake Lively was cast as Carol Ferris, Peter Sarsgaard was in negotiations to portray Hector Hammond, and Mark Strong was in negotiations to play Sinestro. In February, Tim Robbins joined the cast as Senator Hammond. The following month, New Zealanders Temuera Morrison and Taika Waititi had joined the cast as Abin Sur and Tom Kalmaku, respectively.

Filming 

With a production budget of $200 million, Green Lantern was initially scheduled to begin filming in November 2009 at Fox Studios Australia. The start date was pushed back to January 2010, but the production moved to Louisiana, where, on March 3, 2010, test footage was filmed in Madisonville involving stunt cars. Principal photography began on March 15, 2010 in New Orleans, which doubled for Coast City, California, a fictional city in DC Comics. Nine days after filming began, Angela Bassett joined the cast as Dr. Amanda Waller, a government agent who is a staple of the DC Comics universe.

In April 2010, Jon Tenney revealed that he would play Hal Jordan's father, test pilot Martin H. Jordan. Against Campbell's wishes, the film's production head decided to have the sequence of Martin's death in an air crash intercut with Hal plunging in the plane and witnessing the flashbacks coming to him. By June 2010, filming had begun at New Orleans Lakefront Airport. In the same month, it was reported that Mike Doyle has been cast for the role of Jack Jordan, the older brother of Hal Jordan. In July 2010, it was reported that Ryan Reynolds was injured while shooting scenes for the film, separating his shoulder and was in "lots of pain".

While promoting Deadpool (in which Reynolds portrays another famous comic book superhero) in 2016, Reynolds said that filming Green Lantern itself had been frustrating, "You really need a visionary behind a movie like that, but it was the classic studio story: "We have a poster, but we don't have a script or know what we want; let's start shooting!" In an exclusive interview with ScreenRant in 2021, Campbell reflected that he should not have directed the film after all and admitted responsibility for the film "not working out". Comparing to how he saw all James Bond films before directing Casino Royale, Campbell acknowledged that superheroes movies were never his "cup of tea".

Post-production 
Geoff Johns confirmed that the film had ended principal photography on August 6, 2010 and entered post-production. In an interview with MTV News, director Martin Campbell was asked about the film's effects-heavy epic scale and commented "It's daunting, just the process, (there are) something like 1,300 visual shots, it's mind-blowing, quite honestly". When asked about the constructs created from the power rings, Campbell stated "One of the nice things is, we'll all sit down and say, 'Well, what are we going to do here?' Really, it's as much as your imagination can go to make the constructs". The studio also confirmed that the film would have a 3D release.

In January 2011, it was reported that Green Lantern had begun re-shoots for key scenes at Warner Bros. Studios in Los Angeles, California. In March 2011 it was reported that Geoffrey Rush had joined the cast as the voice of the CGI-created character, Tomar-Re.

In April 2011, Michael Clarke Duncan entered negotiations to voice Kilowog. Also in April it was reported that Warner Bros. raised the visual effects budget by $9 million and hired additional visual effects studios to bolster the ranks of the team that had been working overtime to meet the film's June 17 launch.

Music 

The soundtrack was released in stores on June 14, 2011. The soundtrack was composed by James Newton Howard, who also worked on the other Warner Bros./DC Comics-based films Batman Begins and The Dark Knight with Hans Zimmer. The soundtrack was published by WaterTower Music.

Release

Theatrical
The world premiere of Green Lantern took place on June 15, 2011 at Grauman's Chinese Theatre in Hollywood, California, and was released in North America and the UK two days later on June 17.

Home media 
Green Lantern was released on DVD and Blu-ray on October 14, 2011. The Blu-ray release includes an extended cut, which adds an extra nine minutes of footage to the running time, totaling 123 minutes.

Marketing 
Marketing and promotion of the film cost $100 million. The first footage of the film was shown at the 2010 San Diego Comic-Con. The footage was widely released online in November 2010 with thirty seconds of footage airing the following day on Entertainment Tonight. The first full theatrical trailer for the film was shown before screenings of Harry Potter and the Deathly Hallows – Part 1 and became available online in November 2010. This initial trailer was met with a poor reception from fans and, as a result, the film's marketing campaign was delayed. Sue Kroll, the studio's worldwide marketing president stated, "Part of the reason the response to the first trailer was lukewarm was that the big-scale sequences weren't ready to show, and we suffered for it. We can't afford to do that again." In April Warner Bros. debuted nine minutes of footage at the 2011 WonderCon in San Francisco. The Hollywood Reporter reported that the footage wowed the audience. A four-minute cut of the WonderCon footage was later released online.

Animation 
In March 2010, Comics Continuum reported that an animated Green Lantern film was in the works at Warner Bros. Animation and would be part of a direct-to-video project that was timed for release of the live-action Green Lantern movie in the summer of 2011. The Green Lantern animated project would likely take a look at the origins of the Green Lantern Corps, including the first ring wielders. In an interview with Bruce Timm, the producer revealed that a sequel to the Green Lantern animated movie had been discussed but canceled because of the picture not achieving the immediate success that they had hoped for. However, Timm did hope the live-action film would renew interest in a sequel. The animated movie entitled Green Lantern: Emerald Knights was officially announced in June 2010 instead.

Comics 
DC Entertainment began releasing a series of Green Lantern Movie Prequel comics the week before the film was released, covering the lives of the characters before the events of the film, written by members of the film's production team. Five comics were made, covering Tomar-Re by Marc Guggenheim, Kilowog by Peter J. Tomasi, Abin Sur by Michael Green, Hal Jordan by Greg Berlanti and Sinestro by Michael Goldenberg and Geoff Johns. A free excerpt of the Sinestro prequel comic was released online as "Secret Origin of the Green Lantern Corps #1" two days before the release of the film.

Roller coaster 
Six Flags debuted two roller coasters named Green Lantern at Great Adventure and Magic Mountain in 2011 to coincide with the film's release. A third ride, Green Lantern Coaster, also opened in November of the same year at Warner Bros. Movie World in Australia, although this ride was more based on the original comic.

Video game 
Warner Bros. Interactive produced a tie-in video game, Green Lantern: Rise of the Manhunters, for the PlayStation 3 and Xbox 360 by Double Helix Games, with versions for the Nintendo Wii, Nintendo DS, and Nintendo 3DS by Griptonite Games.

Reception

Box office 
Green Lantern opened on Friday, June 17, 2011 in North America, earning $3.4 million in 1,180 midnight runs. The film went on to gross $21.4 million its opening day, but fell 22% on Saturday for a weekend total of $53.2 million, earning it the No. 1 spot. In its second weekend, Green Lantern dropped into third place behind Cars 2 and Bad Teacher, experiencing a 66.1% decline, which was the largest second-weekend decline for a superhero film in 2011. Green Lantern grossed $116.6 million in the U.S. and Canada, as well as $103.3 million internationally, bringing its worldwide total to $220 million.

Many industry analysts felt that Green Lantern "failed to perform to expectations". The Hollywood Reporter speculated that Green Lantern needed to make approximately $500 million to be considered financially solid. Some publications listed the losses for the studio as high as $75 million.

Critical response 
The site's critical consensus reads, "Noisy, overproduced, and thinly written, Green Lantern squanders an impressive budget and decades of comics mythology." On Metacritic, the film has a score of 39 out of 100 based on 39 critics, indicating "generally unfavorable reviews". Audiences polled by CinemaScore gave the film an average grade of "B" on an A+ to F scale.

Justin Chang of Variety gave Green Lantern a mixed review, stating, "Martin Campbell's visually lavish sci-fi adventure is a highly unstable alloy of the serious, the goofy and the downright derivative." Manohla Dargis of The New York Times wrote, "Green Lantern is bad. This despite Ryan Reynolds's dazzling dentistry, hard-body physique and earnest efforts, and the support of fine performers like Peter Sarsgaard ... Mark Strong ... and Angela Bassett". Christy Lemire of the Associated Press called it a "joyless amalgamation of expository dialogue and special effects that aren't especially special." Roger Ebert of the Chicago Sun-Times had mixed feelings, stating, "Green Lantern does not intend to be plausible. It intends to be a sound-and-light show, assaulting the audience with sensational special effects. If that's what you want, that's what you get." British newspaper The Daily Telegraph named Green Lantern one of the ten worst films of 2011.

Todd McCarthy of The Hollywood Reporter gave it a positive review, saying the film "serves up all the requisite elements with enough self-deprecating humor to suggest it doesn't take itself too seriously". Reviewer Leonard Maltin felt that "the film offers a dazzling array of visual effects, a likable hero, a beautiful leading lady, a colorful villain, and a good backstory. It also doesn't take itself too seriously." Kenneth Turan of the Los Angeles Times wrote, "More science-fiction space opera than superhero epic, it works in fits and starts as its disparate parts go in and out of effectiveness, but the professionalism of the production make it watchable in a comic book kind of way".

Accolades

Future

Cancelled sequel 

In 2010, director Martin Campbell confirmed the possibility of a Green Lantern trilogy. Warner Bros. originally planned on Green Lantern being the first entry of a new DC film series, and commissioned a script for a sequel from Greg Berlanti, Michael Green, and Marc Guggenheim while filming for the first film was underway. 

In August 2010, Michael Goldenberg was still attached to write the screenplay, based on the sequel treatment. The scene in the film's end credits showing a resurgence of the yellow power ring of fear, with Sinestro becoming corrupted by its dark power, teased the planned sequel. 

In September 2011, Warner Bros., dismayed by the film's negative reviews and disappointing box office run, abandoned plans for sequels.

Cancelled DC Extended Universe reboot 

In June 2013, David S. Goyer confirmed that Man of Steel is the first film in the DC Extended Universe. This confirmed that should the Green Lantern property be featured in an upcoming DC film, it will be a rebooted version. Later that year Goyer stated that he had interest in making a new feature film based on the titular character. 

In July 2015, Warner Bros. announced plans to release a solo Green Lantern film titled Green Lantern Corps, with an original release date scheduled for June 19, 2020. The film will be an installment in the DC Extended Universe. Hal Jordan and John Stewart will reportedly be the Green Lanterns focused on in the film. 

In January 2016, it was reported that Goyer and Justin Rhodes will be writing the film's script and will also produce the film, with Geoff Johns and Jon Berg as executive producers. In November 2019, Johns was expected to deliver his script to Warner Bros. by the end of the year.

In March 2021, after the release of Zack Snyder's Justice League, the director's cut of Justice League, Zack Snyder revealed that a scrapped idea for the film had Batman meeting up with the Green Lantern Corps, with Ryan Reynolds appearing as an "additional lantern... to fill out the corps a bit." Snyder never spoke with Reynolds about this, however.

Cancelled Greg Berlanti television series
A 10 one-hour episodic Green Lantern television series separate from the film is currently in development for HBO Max from Marc Guggenheim and Seth Grahame-Smith with Berlanti Productions producing the series. The series will focus on the Guy Gardner, Jessica Cruz, Simon Baz, and Alan Scott versions of Green Lantern alongside Sinestro and Kilowog. The series' title was revealed to be Lanterns in January 2023. The version with Berlanti was confirmed to have been cancelled, with this new series focusing on Hal Jordan and John Stewart as part of DC Studios' new shared universe.

DC Universe reboot 

In December 2022, DC Studios CEO James Gunn confirmed that the Green Lantern characters would be an important part of the new DCU. When he and co-CEO Peter Safran unveiled the first projects from their DCU slate later that month they included Lanterns, a new iteration of a long-in-development Green Lantern series. Safran said the series would be an Earth-based detective story and "a huge HBO-quality event" in the style of the series True Detective (2014–present).

Safran said the mystery that Jordan and Stewart investigate in the series leads into the main storyline for the DCU.

Arrowverse

The Arrowverse crossover event "Crisis on Infinite Earths" establishes that the 2011 film version of Green Lantern takes place on the world of Earth-12.

In popular culture 
The disappointing performance of the film is occasionally a target of mockery from superhero-related comedies, including by Ryan Reynolds and DC themselves.

The 2016 film Deadpool, which stars Reynolds as the titular character, refers to the film in two scenes: the opening scene which features a drawing of Green Lantern, and a later scene where Reynolds' character (who has the ability to break the fourth wall) insists that his suit will not be "green or animated". In the film's sequel, there is a post-credits scene in which Deadpool travels back in time to shoot Reynolds before he can make the film. 
Before that, in a 2018 advertising campaign for Deadpool 2 featuring David Beckham, Ryan Reynolds (dressed as Deadpool) is seen apologizing for Reynolds' critical and commercial flops, including Green Lantern, R.I.P.D., Self/less and Blade: Trinity.

The DC animated film Teen Titans Go! To the Movies (2018) also makes a reference to Green Lantern's disappointing film.

In a promotion video for Free Guy in 2019, Reynolds and Waititi, who co-starred in both movies, jokingly denied that they had ever heard of Green Lantern.

References

External links 

 
 
 
 
 

2011 films
2011 3D films
2011 science fiction films
2011 science fiction action films
2010s superhero films
American coming-of-age films
American science fantasy films
American science fiction action films
2010s English-language films
Films directed by Martin Campbell
Films produced by Greg Berlanti
Films produced by Donald De Line
Films produced by Geoff Johns
Films scored by James Newton Howard
Films set in California
Films set on fictional planets
Films shot in New Orleans
Films about orphans
Films about brothers
Films about families
American films about revenge
Films about terrorism
Green Lantern films
Patricide in fiction
Films using motion capture
Films with screenplays by Greg Berlanti
Films with screenplays by Michael Goldenberg
Warner Bros. films
Films set in 1993
Films set in 2011
Films with screenplays by Michael Green (writer)
Films adapted into comics
2010s American films
Films based on DC Comics